Matapuna had several sidings on the North Island Main Trunk line, in the Ruapehu District of New Zealand, serving the east Taumarunui suburb on the north bank of the Whanganui River. Work was largely complete by May 1903, and freight was handled from 22 June 1903. A fixed signal was placed at the station and a distant at the bridge in 1917 and the ballast pit siding was interlocked by tablet in 1918. A racecourse opened to the south of the bridge in 1916 and some trains served the course on race days, though no platform appears on aerial photos and only the ballast pit was mapped.

Before the railway came, a Ngāti Hāua kāinga was on the south side of the river, which could be forded, except when in flood.

Matapuna Bridge 
Matapuna Bridge, to the south east of the station, takes the NIMT over the Whanganui River. It was built from March 1903 to January 1904 by Scott Bros. Ltd. Peter Seton Hay, Engineer-in-Chief of the Public Works Department, was probably the designer. The bridge was repaired and strengthened in 1916, 1938, 1956, 1965, 1967 and 2006. The 1903 central cast iron cylinder piers, cutwaters, timber cross-bracings and boxing remain, though most other parts have been replaced. From 1905 to May 1962 it was a road rail bridge, with traffic controlled by bridge-keepers. Road use ended when a concrete bridge opened on SH4.

Puketapu Sawmilling Co Ltd 
Puketapu was recognised as a potential source of totara as early as 1903 and the company was advertising for bush cutting and construction of a  tramway in 1905. The sawmill must have been operating by 1906, when they experimented with floating sawn timber down the river. The company was in liquidation in 1909, but was taken over by Pukuweka Sawmills. The bush tramway was linked to the main line and had two locomotives in 1911. The last year the mill was recorded as using the railway siding was 1915.

Ballast pit 
Most of the original ballast for the central portion of the NIMT was extracted from the river at the ballast reserve, just north of the bridge, from 1903.

References

External links 
Photos

 bridge under construction in 1903
 locomotive and workmen at the ballast pit in 1903
 newly laid railway in 1906 with felled bush either side
 bridge deck in 1906
 bridge and Puketapu sawmill
 bridge and river about 1915
 1947 aerial photo

Video - Electric-hauled freight train in 2018

Railway stations in New Zealand
Ruapehu District
Rail transport in Manawatū-Whanganui
Buildings and structures in Manawatū-Whanganui
Heritage New Zealand Category 1 historic places in Manawatū-Whanganui
Railway stations opened in 1908
Railway stations closed in 1987